Populonia Stazione is a village in Tuscany, central Italy, administratively a frazione of the comune of Piombino, province of Livorno. At the time of the 2011 census its population was 234.

The village is about 72 km from Livorno and 9 km from Piombino.

References

Bibliography 
 

Frazioni of Piombino